Princess Marina, Duchess of Kent  (born Princess Marina of Greece and Denmark, ; 27 August 1968) was a Greek princess by birth and a British princess by marriage. She was a daughter of Prince Nicholas of Greece and Denmark and Grand Duchess Elena Vladimirovna of Russia, and a granddaughter of King George I and Queen Olga of Greece. Princess Marina married Prince George, Duke of Kent, fourth son of King George V and Queen Mary, in 1934. They had three children: Prince Edward, Princess Alexandra, and Prince Michael.

Marina was widowed in 1942, when her husband was killed in a plane crash on active service. In later life she carried out many royal engagements, including the independence celebrations for Ghana and Botswana.

Early life

Princess Marina was born on 13 December 1906 in Athens, Greece, during the reign of her paternal grandfather, George I of Greece. She was the third and youngest daughter of Prince Nicholas of Greece and Denmark, and his wife Grand Duchess Elena Vladimirovna of Russia. Her father was the third son of George I of Greece and Queen Olga, while her mother was the only daughter of Grand Duke Vladimir Alexandrovich and Grand Duchess Maria Pavlovna of Russia. Her father was a grandson of Christian IX of Denmark, while her mother was a granddaughter of Emperor Alexander II of Russia.

Princess Marina had two elder sisters, Princess Olga and Princess Elizabeth. Princess Olga married Prince Paul of Yugoslavia in 1923. After the assassination of his cousin, Alexander I of Yugoslavia, Paul served as Prince Regent of Yugoslavia from 1934 to 1941. Princess Elizabeth married Carl Theodor, Count of Toeering-Jettenbach in 1934. One of their paternal uncles was Prince Andrew of Greece and Denmark, the father of Prince Philip, Duke of Edinburgh (making Marina and her sisters Philip's first cousins).

Marina spent her early years in Greece, and lived with her parents and paternal grandparents at Tatoi Palace. Along with her sisters, she was raised to be devout and religious, which was encouraged by her grandmother, Queen Olga of Greece. Marina's family travelled outside of Greece often, especially during the summer months. Her first recorded visit to Britain was in 1910, when she was 3, after the death of her godfather, Edward VII. During that visit, she met her other godmother and future mother-in-law, Queen Mary, who treated Marina and her sisters like her own children.

The Greek royal family was forced into exile when Marina was 11, following the overthrow of the Greek monarchy. They later moved to Paris, while the Princess stayed with her extended family throughout Europe.

Marriage and children

Wedding ceremony

In 1932, Princess Marina and Prince George (later the Duke of Kent), a second cousin through Christian IX of Denmark, met in London. Their betrothal was announced in August 1934. Prince George was created Duke of Kent on 9 October 1934. On 29 November 1934, they married at Westminster Abbey, London. The wedding was a grand affair, as it had been more than eleven  years since the last royal wedding with Prince Albert, Duke of York, and Lady Elizabeth Bowes-Lyon (later King George VI and Queen Elizabeth). The wedding of Prince George and Princess Marina was the first royal wedding ceremony to be broadcast by wireless, and with the use of other technology, such as microphones—the control room was located underneath the Unknown Warrior's tomb of Westminster Abbey. The service was broadcast locally and abroad to other nations, and loudspeakers allowed spectators from outside the Abbey to hear the proceedings. The wedding was followed by a Greek ceremony in the private chapel at Buckingham Palace, which was converted into an Orthodox chapel for the ceremony. The wedding was the most recent occasion on which a princess from another royal family married into the British royal family.

The wedding dress was designed by Edward Molyneux, who had worked with Marina previously. The dress was made from white silk and silver lamé brocade, with a raised English rose design.

Her eight bridesmaids were her first cousins, Greek princesses Irene, Eugenie and Katherine, her maternal first cousin Grand Duchess Kira Kirillovna of Russia, her first cousin once removed Princess Juliana of the Netherlands, her husband's niece Princess Elizabeth of York, her husband's cousins the Lady Iris Mountbatten and Lady Mary Cambridge.

The Royal School of Needlework made a quilt as a wedding gift for Princess Marina and the Duke of Kent.

Married life

The Duke and Duchess set up their first home at 3 Belgrave Square, close to Buckingham Palace. She became a patroness of several organizations and charities, including the Elizabeth Garrett Anderson Hospital, the Women's Hospital Fund, and the Central School of Speech and Drama. She would continue to support these charities and institutions for the rest of her life. She became very close to her mother-in-law, Queen Mary, with whom she would usually spend time while her husband was off performing his own royal duties.

The couple had three children:

Prince Edward, Duke of Kent (9 October 1935): he married Katharine Worsley on 8 June 1961. They have three children.
Princess Alexandra, The Honourable Lady Ogilvy (25 December 1936): she married the Hon. Angus Ogilvy, son of David Ogilvy, 12th Earl of Airlie and Lady Alexandra Coke, on 24 April 1963. They had two children.
Prince Michael of Kent (4 July 1942): he married Baroness Marie Christine von Reibnitz on 30 June 1978. They have two children.

The Duke of Kent was killed on 25 August 1942, in an aeroplane crash at Eagles Rock, near Dunbeath, Caithness, Scotland, while on active service with the Royal Air Force. The Duchess, according to royal biographer Hugo Vickers, was "the only war widow in Britain whose estate was forced to pay
death duties".

During World War II, Marina was trained as a nurse for three months under the pseudonym "Sister Kay" and joined the civil nurse reserve.

Later life and death

After her husband's death, the Duchess of Kent continued to be an active member of the British royal family, carrying out a wide range of royal and official engagements. She was the president of the Wimbledon All England Lawn Tennis and Croquet Club for 26 years. She was also the president of the Royal National Lifeboat Institution from 1943 until her death and was awarded the RNLI's gold medal in 1967 to mark this contribution. One of her first cousins was Prince Philip (later the Duke of Edinburgh), who married her niece, the future Queen Elizabeth II, in 1947.

In 1947, Princess Marina visited Greece and Italy. In June 1952 the Duchess laid the foundation stone of the new St Mark's Church in Bromley, London, which had been damaged in the war.

In 1952, the Duchess also visited Sarawak (then a British Crown Colony), where she laid the foundation stone of the Cathedral of St Thomas in Kuching. She also visited the Batu Lintang camp, a Japanese internment camp during World War II which had been converted to a teacher training college, and the city of Sibu, where she opened the outpatient department of the Lau Kheng Howe Hospital.

In March 1957, when the Gold Coast achieved independence from Britain as Ghana, the Duchess of Kent was appointed to represent the Queen at the celebrations. Fifty years later, at the 50th anniversary of Ghana's independence, her son, Prince Edward, Duke of Kent, was appointed by the Queen to represent her.

Marina earned a place in the International Best Dressed List Hall of Fame in 1960 together with the Princess of Monaco, Patricia Lopez-Willshaw and Merle Oberon. In 1964, the Princess took an extensive tour of Australia and officially opened Gladesville Bridge in Sydney.

In September 1966, when the British Protectorate of Bechuanaland became the new Republic of Botswana, the Princess was appointed again to represent the Queen at the celebrations. The main public hospital in Gaborone, the new Botswana's capital, is named "Princess Marina Hospital". She was the Chancellor of the University of Kent at Canterbury from 1963 until her death.

Princess Marina, Duchess of Kent, died of a brain tumour at Kensington Palace at 11.40 am on 27 August 1968, aged 61. The funeral service for the Princess was held at St. George's Chapel on 30 August. She was buried in the Royal Burial Ground, Frogmore. Her funeral was the last royal ceremony attended by her brother-in-law, the former king Edward VIII. Her will was sealed in London after her death in 1968. Her estate was valued at £76,166 (or £940,600 in 2022 when adjusted for inflation).

Legacy

Princess Marina gave her name to many facilities, including:
 Princess Marina College, Arborfield, Berkshire
 Princess Marina House, a facility of the Royal Air Force Benevolent Fund at Rustington.
 Princess Marina Hospital, Upton, Northamptonshire
 Princess Marina Hospital, Gaborone, Botswana
 Princess Marina Sports Complex, Rickmansworth.
 Duchess of Kent Hospital, Sandakan, Sabah, Malaysia
 Kent College (a teacher training college) Tuaran, Sabah, Malaysia

References in popular culture
 The Kinks recorded "She's Bought a Hat Like Princess Marina" for their 1969 album Arthur (or the Decline and Fall of the British Empire). The song was written by Ray Davies. 
 In 2017, Clare Holman portrayed Princess Marina in the season 2 finale of The Crown.

Honours and arms

Honours
Commonwealth
CI: Companion of the Order of the Crown of India 1937
GCVO: Dame Grand Cross of the Royal Victorian Order 1948
GBE: Dame Grand Cross of the Order of the British Empire 1937
GCStJ: Dame Grand Cross of the Order of St. John of Jerusalem 1935
Royal Family Order of King George V
Royal Family Order of King George VI
Royal Family Order of Queen Elizabeth II
 Canadian Forces Decoration

Foreign
 Dame Grand Cross of the Order of Saints Olga and Sophia
 Dame of the Order of Beneficence
 Grand Cross of the Order of the Aztec Eagle
 Grand Cross of the Order of the Sun of Peru
 Grand Cross of the Order of Merit
 Grand Cross of the Order of the Southern Cross
 Grand Cross of the Order of the Liberator San Martin
 Grand Decoration in Gold with Sash for Services to the Republic of Austria
 House of Romanov: Dame Grand Cordon of the Imperial Order of Saint Catherine

Honorary military appointments

 Colonel-in-Chief, of The Kent Regiment
 Colonel-in-Chief, of The Queen's Own Royal West Kent Regiment
 Colonel-in-Chief, of The Dorset Regiment
 Colonel-in-Chief, of The Essex and Kent Scottish Regiment
 Colonel-in-Chief, of The Devonshire and Dorset Regiment
 Colonel-in-Chief, of the Corps of Royal Electrical and Mechanical Engineers
 Colonel-in-Chief, of The Queen's Regiment (Allied)
Honorary Colonel, of the Buckinghamshire Battalion, The Oxfordshire and Buckinghamshire Light Infantry
Honorary Colonel, of the 4th Battalion, The Oxfordshire and Buckinghamshire Light Infantry
Honorary Colonel, of the 431 LAA Regiment RA
Honorary Colonel, of the 299th (Royal Buckinghamshire Yeomanry, Queen's Own Oxfordshire Hussars, and Berkshire) Field Regiment, RA
Honorary Colonel, of the Buckinghamshire Regiment, RA (Territorials)
Colonel, of the Queen's Own Buffs
 Commandant, Women's Royal Naval Service (1940–1968) (Chief Commandant from 1951)
 Honorary Commandant, of the Women's Royal Australian Naval Service

Arms

Ancestry

See also
List of people with brain tumours

References

External links

 

1906 births
1968 deaths
Burials at the Royal Burial Ground, Frogmore
Chancellors of the University of Kent
Companions of the Order of the Crown of India
Dames Grand Cross of the Order of the British Empire
Dames Grand Cross of the Royal Victorian Order
Dames Grand Cross of the Order of St John
Danish princesses
Deaths from brain cancer in England
Double dames
Duchesses of Kent
Female admirals
Grand Crosses of the Order of Beneficence (Greece)
Grand Crosses of the Order of the Sun of Peru
Grand Crosses of the Order of the Liberator General San Martin
Greek princesses
House of Glücksburg (Greece)
House of Windsor
Nobility from Athens
Recipients of the Grand Decoration with Sash for Services to the Republic of Austria
Royal Navy admirals of World War II
Wives of British princes
Wives of knights
World War II nurses
Women's Royal Naval Service officers